Sphingnotus is a genus of beetle belonging to the family Cerambycidae.

List of species
 Sphingnotus dunningi Pascoe, 1867
 Sphingnotus insignis Perroud, 1855
 Sphingnotus mirabilis (Boisduval, 1835)

References
 Biolib
 F. Vitali - Cerambycoidea
 Global species

Tmesisternini